Byron Ross (born February 19, 1985) is a former professional American and Canadian football wide receiver. He was signed by the New Orleans Saints as an undrafted free agent in 2008. He played college football for the Southeastern Louisiana Lions.

External links
Saskatchewan Roughriders bio

1985 births
Living people
Players of American football from Louisiana
American players of Canadian football
American football wide receivers
Canadian football wide receivers
New Orleans Saints players
Saskatchewan Roughriders players
People from Independence, Louisiana